The 1969–70 Boston Bruins season was the Bruins' 46th season in the NHL.The Bruins were coming off of a successful season in 1968–69, as they finished with a franchise record 100 points, sitting in 2nd place in the Eastern Division, however, they would lose to the Montreal Canadiens in the Eastern Division finals. This year, the Bruins would go all the way to the Final and win the Stanley Cup.

Regular season

The year was marred by an infamous incident in a preseason game against the St. Louis Blues, when veteran Ted Green had an ugly stick fight with Wayne Maki of the Blues.  Green suffered a fractured skull and a brain injury as a result of the fight, necessitating a permanent steel plate put in his head and missing the entirety of the season. Both were charged with assault as a result of the incident, the first time NHL players faced criminal charges as a result of on-ice violence, and were eventually acquitted.

Boston got off to a quick start, going unbeaten in their first 7 games (6–0–1), which immediately was followed by a 5-game winless streak.  The Bruins though would snap out of their mini-slump, and never have a 2-game losing streak for the remainder of the season, finishing the year with a 40–17–19 record, earning 99 points, which tied the Chicago Black Hawks for 1st place in the Eastern Division.  Chicago was awarded 1st place though due to having more wins than Boston, as the Hawks recorded 45.

Bobby Orr had a breakout season, leading the league with 120 points, becoming the first defenseman in league history to record over 100 points, while setting an NHL record with 87 assists.  Orr also scored 33 goals, which also was a record by a defenseman.  Orr also provided toughness, leading the Bruins with 125 PIM.  Phil Esposito had another very strong season, scoring 43 goals and earning 99 points, while John McKenzie registered 70 points.  Thirty-four-year-old John Bucyk scored a career high 31 goals and tied his career best with 69 points.

In goal, Gerry Cheevers received the majority of playing time, winning a team high 24 games, and having a team best 2.72 GAA and 4 shutouts.  Eddie Johnston was his backup, as he won 16 games, had a 2.98 GAA, and 3 shutouts.

Season standings

Schedule and results

Playoffs
In the playoffs, Boston faced the New York Rangers in the quarterfinals, which finished in 4th place in the Eastern Division with 92 points, seven less than the Bruins.  The series opened at the Boston Garden, and the Bruins continued their winning ways at home, taking the first two games to take an early series lead.  The series then moved to Madison Square Garden in New York for the next two games, and the Rangers responded with two close wins, tying the series up at two games each.  Boston returned home for game 5, and took a 3–2 series lead with a hard fought 3–2 win, going on to beat the Rangers in game 6 on the road 4–1 to advance to the Eastern Division finals.

The Bruins opponent for the division finals was the Chicago Black Hawks, which finished with 99 points (the same as Boston, but with more wins, so Chicago was awarded home ice for the series).  Boston surprised the Chicago fans by taking the first two games held at Chicago Stadium with relative ease to take a 2–0 series lead.  Boston then won game 3 by a 5–2 score at the Boston Garden, taking a commanding 3–0 lead in the series.  The Black Hawks kept game 4 close, but lost the game 5–4, as Boston swept Chicago to advance to the Stanley Cup Finals for the first time since 1958.

Boston Bruins vs. St. Louis Blues

Boston faced the winner of the Western Division, the St. Louis Blues, making its 3rd straight Stanley Cup final appearance.  The Blues had been swept by the Montreal Canadiens in both their previous appearances in the Finals.  St. Louis defeated the Minnesota North Stars and Pittsburgh Penguins to reach the Finals.  The series opened at the St. Louis Arena, and the Bruins had no problems at all in their first two games, defeating the Blues by scores of 6–1 and 6–2 to take a 2–0 series lead.  The series shifted to Boston for the next two games, and the Bruins dominated game 3, winning 4–1.  St. Louis forced the 4th game into sudden death; however the Bruins, on an overtime goal by Bobby Orr, won 4–3, thus winning an NHL record 10th straight playoff game and their first Stanley Cup since 1941.  The still photo of Orr flying through the air after scoring "The Goal" — he had been tripped in the act of shooting by Blues defenseman Noel Picard — became one of the most iconic images of hockey history, and was the basis of a bronze sculpture of the event outside the TD Garden's main entrance in 2010, the date of the event's 40th anniversary.

Boston Bruins 4, New York Rangers 2

Boston Bruins 4, Chicago Black Hawks 0

Boston Bruins 4, St. Louis Blues 0

Player statistics

Regular season
Scoring

Goaltending

Playoffs
Scoring

Goaltending

Awards and records
 Bobby Orr, Art Ross Trophy
 Bobby Orr, Conn Smythe Trophy
 Bobby Orr, Hart Memorial Trophy
 Bobby Orr, Norris Trophy
 Bobby Orr, NHL Plus/Minus Award
 Bobby Orr, NHL Record, Plus/Minus +124

Draft picks
Boston's draft picks at the 1969 NHL Amateur Draft

See also
1969–70 NHL season

References

SHRP Sports
The Internet Hockey Database
National Hockey League Guide & Record Book 2007

Stanley Cup championship seasons
Boston Bruins seasons
Boston Bruins
Boston Bruins
Boston Bruins
Boston Bruins
1960s in Boston
Bruins